Stadionul Nicolae Rainea, formerly known as Dunărea Stadium, is a multi-purpose stadium, frequently used for football. It is located in Galați and was the home ground of CSU Galați and Dunărea Galaţi, among others. The stadium holds 23,000 people. Named after Nicolae Rainea, it is the 7th stadium in the country by capacity (List of football stadiums in Romania).

Gallery

Football venues in Romania
Buildings and structures in Galați
Multi-purpose stadiums in Romania